These are the full results of the 2017 South American Championships in Athletics which took place in Luque, Asunción, Paraguay, from 23 to 25 June at the Pista Comité Olímpico Paraguayo.

Men's results

100 meters

Heats – 23 JuneWind:Heat 1: +3.4 m/s, Heat 2: +2.4 m/s,  Heat 3: +2.3 m/s

Final – 23 JuneWind:+1.9 m/s

200 meters

Heats – 24 JuneWind:Heat 1: +3.3 m/s, Heat 2: +3.0 m/s,  Heat 3: +3.0 m/s

Final – 25 JuneWind:+2.2 m/s

400 meters

Heats – 23 June

Final – 23 June

800 meters
24 June

1500 meters
23 June

5000 meters
25 June

10,000 meters
23 June

110 meters hurdles
24 JuneWind: +3.8 m/s

400 meters hurdles

Heats – 24 June

Final – 24 June

3000 meters steeplechase
24 June

4 × 100 meters relay
24 July

4 × 400 meters relay
25 July

20,000 meters walk
25 June

High jump
23 June

Pole vault
23 June

Long jump
24 June

Triple jump
25 June

Shot put
24 June

Discus throw
23 June

Hammer throw
25 June

Javelin throw
24 June

Decathlon
23–24 June

Women's results

100 meters

Heats – 23 JuneWind:Heat 1: +2.8 m/s, Heat 2: +3.5 m/s

Final – 23 JuneWind:+3.4 m/s

200 meters

Heats – 24 JuneWind:Heat 1: +2.8 m/s, Heat 2: +2.6 m/s

Final – 25 JuneWind:+2.8 m/s

400 meters

Heats – 23 June

Final – 23 June

800 meters
25 June

1500 meters
23 June

5000 meters
25 June

10,000 meters
23 June

100 meters hurdles
23 JuneWind: +2.9 m/s

400 meters hurdles

Heats – 24 June

Final – 24 June

3000 meters steeplechase
24 June

4 × 100 meters relay
24 July

4 × 400 meters relay
25 July

20,000 meters walk
24 June

High jump
25 June

Pole vault
23 June

Long jump
24 June

Triple jump
23 June

Shot put
25 June

Discus throw
23 June

Hammer throw
24 June

Javelin throw
23 June

Heptathlon
24–25 June

References

South American Championships in Athletics - Results
Events at the South American Championships in Athletics